The Paramount Theater in Charlottesville, Virginia, United States was designed by Rapp and Rapp and opened in 1931 as a movie theater.  The Paramount continued showing movies until it closed in 1974.  In 1990 a group of community members purchased the theater, formed a nonprofit corporation and began raising funds for its restoration and expansion.  In late 2004 the Paramount re-opened after an $18 million renovation.  It is operated by a non-profit organization and is a performing arts venue for the community.

Beginning in 2009 the theater has played host to performances by Charlottesville Opera.

References

External links
 
Paramount Theater history

Buildings and structures in Charlottesville, Virginia
Theatres in Virginia
1931 establishments in Virginia
Theatres completed in 1931